Dettighofen is a village in the Swiss canton of Thurgau. Since 1998, it is part of the municipality of Pfyn.

External links

Villages in Thurgau
Former municipalities of Thurgau